Bronchocela burmana, the Burmese green crested lizard, is a species of agamid lizard. It is endemic to Malay Peninsula and is known from southern Myanmar and Thailand.

References

Bronchocela
Reptiles of Myanmar
Reptiles of Thailand
Reptiles described in 1878
Taxa named by William Thomas Blanford
Reptiles of the Malay Peninsula